Jaryd Clifford (born 5 July 1999) is an Australian Paralympic, vision impaired, middle-distance athlete. He represented Australia at the 2016 Rio Paralympics in athletics. He won gold medals in the Men's 1500m and 5000m T13 events at the 2019 World Para Athletics Championships. Clifford represented Australia at the 2020 Summer Paralympics in Tokyo, where he won silver medals in the Men's 5000m T13 and Men's Marathon T12, and a bronze medal in the Men's 1500 m T13.

Personal
Clifford was born on 5 July 1999. During primary school his eyesight deteriorated due to juvenile macular degeneration.

Athletics
Clifford is classified as a T12 athlete. In 2014, Clifford came 4th in the 3000m at the Australian All Schools Championships. He competed at the 2015 IPC Athletics World Championships in Doha and came 7th in the T12/13 3000m. In January 2016, his time of 3min 59.6s in the 1500m qualified him for the 2016 Rio Paralympics and he took 10 seconds off the Australian record for T12 athletes. The record had lasted for more than 30 years.

At the 2016 Rio Paralympics, he finished seventh in both the Men's 1500m T13 and Men's 5000m T13 events.

At the 2017 World Para Athletics Championships in London, England, Clifford won the bronze medal in the Men's 1500m T13 in a time of 3:53.31. Clifford credited his altitude training and European racing with assisting him in winning a medal.

At the Sydney Grand Prix on 18 March 2018, Clifford broke the Men's 1500m T12 world record with a time of 3:45.18. He lowered the previous world record of 3:48.31 set by Tunisia's Abderrahim Zhiou at the 2012 London Paralympics.

At the 2019 World Para Athletics Championships in Dubai, Clifford set a world record time of 3:47.78 in winning the gold medal in the Men's 1500m T13. Clifford with his two guides Tim Logan and Philo Saunders won the Men's 5000m T13. Clifford stated he needs guides for the 5000m  due to his deteriorating eyesight making the event dangerous for him.

In 2018, Clifford is a member of the Diamond Valley Athletic Club and Victorian Institute of Sport scholarship holder. In 2020, Jaryd made a permanent move to Canberra.

In his first marathon on 25 April 2021, Clifford ran 2:19:08 to break the existing world record of 2:21:33.

At the 2020 Summer Paralympics in Tokyo, he won silver medals in the Men's 5000m T13 and Men's Marathon T12, and a bronze medal in the Men's 1500 m T13.

His philosophy is "Not everything that is faced can be changed, but nothing can be changed until it is faced".

Marathon progression

Recognition
2017 – Victorian Disability Sport and Recreation Awards – Marg Angel Junior Sportsperson of the Year 
2018 – Sport Australia Hall of Fame Scholarship and mentored by Lauren Burns
2022 - Athletics Australia Russell Short Award for Male Para Athlete of the Year

References

External links
 
 
 Jaryd Clifford at Australian Athletics Historical Results

1999 births
Athletes (track and field) at the 2016 Summer Paralympics
Athletes (track and field) at the 2020 Summer Paralympics
Australian blind people
Living people
Medalists at the 2020 Summer Paralympics
Paralympic silver medalists for Australia
Paralympic bronze medalists for Australia
Paralympic athletes of Australia
Visually impaired category Paralympic competitors
World Para Athletics Championships winners
Athletes from Melbourne